Peggy Ann Garner (February 3, 1932 – October 16, 1984) was an American child actress.

As a child actress, Garner had her first film role in 1938. At the 18th Academy Awards, Garner won the Academy Juvenile Award, recognizing her body of contributions to film in 1945, particularly in A Tree Grows in Brooklyn and Junior Miss.

Featured roles in such films as Black Widow (1954) did not help to establish her in mature film roles, although she progressed to theatrical work and she made acting appearances on television as an adult.

In the mid-1940s, as a promotional trailer to the popular Christmas holiday movie  Miracle on 34th Street Garner appeared as herself on a studio lot accompanied by other young performers.

In 1961 she starred next to Richard Boone in the episode Dream Girl on Have Gun - Will Travel.

Early years
Peggy Ann Garner was born on February 3, 1932, at Aultman Hospital in Canton, Ohio. She was the daughter of 26-year-old William H. Garner, an attorney, and 19-year-old Virginia Craig Garner; they were married in Toledo, Ohio on April 7, 1931. She was pushed by her mother into the limelight and entered in talent quests while still a child. Her parents divorced on February 26, 1947.

Garner was a child model for still photographers for two years before she began working in films in 1938.

Film

By 1938, Garner had made her first film appearance, and over the next few years she appeared in several more films, including Jane Eyre (1943) and The Keys of the Kingdom (1944). She reached the height of her success at the age of 12 in A Tree Grows in Brooklyn (1945), winning an Academy Juvenile Award largely for this performance. In the same year, she showed she could handle comedy by giving a fine performance in Junior Miss (also 1945).

Like many child performers, Garner was unable to make a successful transition into adult film roles.

Stage
In 1949, Garner starred in Peg O' My Heart at the Famous Artists Playhouse in Fayetteville, New York. In 1954, she toured with a troupe in several states, performing in The Moon Is Blue. Garner headlined the national tour of the William Inge hit Broadway play Bus Stop beginning in 1955. She starred with Albert Salmi, who later became her husband. Garner also appeared with Dick York in the touring production.

Garner's Broadway credits include Home Is the Hero, First Lady, The Royal Family, and The Man.

Radio and television
In 1950, Garner starred as Esther Smith in the radio comedy Meet Me in St. Louis. The program ran two months on NBC.

Garner was a panelist in two television programs, Leave It to the Girls on ABC and NBC  and Who Said That? on NBC. In 1951, she starred in the comedy Two Girls Named Smith on ABC.

In summer 1960, she appeared in "The Unfamiliar," an episode of Producer's Choice, and she was cast as Julie in the episode "Stopover" of David McLean's western series Tate. In 1960 and again in 1962, she was cast in the episodes "Once Around the Circuit" and "Build My Gallows Low", respectively, on the ABC series Adventures in Paradise, with Gardner McKay. During the early 1960s she also appeared in one episode each of Bonanza ("The Rival") and Combat!, both under director Robert Altman (see next section).

Later years
After Garner's film career ended, she ventured into stage acting and had some success but also worked as a real estate agent and fleet car executive between acting jobs in order to support herself. After a decade away from work in feature films, she appeared as the pregnant aunt in the critically acclaimed film, A Wedding (1978), directed by Robert Altman, whom she had worked with on television in the early 1960s. Her final screen performance was a small part in a made-for-television feature This Year's Blonde (1980).

Personal life and death
Garner married singer/game show host Richard Hayes on February 22, 1951; the couple divorced in 1953. She then married actor Albert Salmi on May 16, 1956; they divorced on March 13, 1963. (Another source says that Garner and Salmi were married May 18, 1956.) Garner's final marriage was to Kenyon Foster Brown. After a few years, that marriage also ended in divorce.

In 1984, at age 52, Garner died from pancreatic cancer in the Motion Picture & Television Country House and Hospital in Los Angeles. Her only child, Catherine Ann Salmi, died of heart disease on May 17, 1995. She was 38 years old. Peggy's mother, Virginia, outlived both her only child and only grandchild.

Filmography

Film

Television

References

Further reading
 Grabman, Sandra. "Plain Beautiful: The Life of Peggy Ann Garner". Albany: BearManor Media, 2005. .
 Best, Marc. Those Endearing Young Charms: Child Performers of the Screen, South Brunswick and New York: Barnes & Co., 1971, pp. 90–94.
 Dye, David. Child and Youth Actors: Filmography of Their Entire Careers, 1914–1985. Jefferson, NC: McFarland & Co., 1988, p. 83.

External links

 
 
 Peggy Ann Garner photos and links

1932 births
1984 deaths
Actresses from Ohio
American stage actresses
American child actresses
American film actresses
Academy Juvenile Award winners
University High School (Los Angeles) alumni
Deaths from pancreatic cancer
Deaths from cancer in California
Actors from Canton, Ohio
20th-century American actresses
American real estate brokers
American radio actresses
American television actresses
American television personalities
American women television personalities
American women business executives
20th-century American businesspeople
20th-century American businesswomen